Raul Domingos is a Mozambican politician who was part of RENAMO until being thrown out on 7 July 2000. At the time, he had been considered the most likely successor to party leader Afonso Dhlakama. From 1994 to 1999, Domingos was head of the Renamo parliamentary group. In the 2004 Mozambican presidential elections Domingos ran for the Party for Peace, Democracy, and Development, gaining 2.7% of the popular vote.

References
Crisis in Renamo: Raul Domingos suspended in Mozambique News Agency 11 July 2000. Retrieved March 27, 2006.

Year of birth missing (living people)
Living people
RENAMO politicians
Party for Peace, Democracy, and Development politicians
Members of the Assembly of the Republic (Mozambique)